Nico Ladenis (born 22 April 1934) is a Tanganyikan-born chef of Greek descent, best known for his restaurants in the UK. He won three Michelin stars and his restaurant Chez Nico was rated ten out of ten by the Good Food Guide. In 1999, he handed back his stars due in part to prostate cancer and because of his disillusionment with the London restaurant scene.

Early life
Ladenis was born in Tanzania on 22 April 1934, to Greek parents. His family subsequently moved to Provence, France, before Ladenis moved to the UK.

Career
Ladenis is a self-taught chef, and did not attend any culinary schools. Whilst working at his restaurant Chez Nico in Dulwich, London in 1976 or 1977 he met fellow chef Michel Roux at a party, who arranged for him to work for a week at the three Michelin star Moulin de Mougins under Roger Vergé.

In 1989, he opened a bistro-style restaurant in Pimlico, London, called Simply Nico. In 1992, Ladenis opened a new restaurant inside the Grosvenor House Hotel in Mayfair, entitled "Nico at Ninety", and his former two Michelin star restaurant on Great Portland Street was converted into the bistro-style "Nico Central". Nico at Ninety was subsequently renamed back to Chez Nico, where in 1995 the restaurant was awarded three Michelin stars.

In 1999, he asked the Michelin reviewers to exclude him from the guide, and gave up his three Michelin stars in the process. He said in a press statement at the time that "Working in a three-star restaurant is very restrictive and people do not want to eat very expensive food. You cannot fool around in the restaurant if you have three stars and I want to make it more relaxed." He later admitted that this was due in part from being disillusioned with the restaurant scene in London, but also because he had been diagnosed with prostate cancer the month before speaking to the Michelin reviewers. He subsequently opened more restaurants: in 2000, Incognico opened on Shaftesbury Avenue; in 2002, Deca opened on Conduit street. He decided to step back from running restaurants in 2003, and retire fully from the business. His two daughters remained involved in both businesses.

Personal life and legacy
Ladenis is married to Dinah-Jane Ladenis, with whom he has two daughters, Isabella and Natasha.

Chez Nico, under Ladenis, remains one of only seven restaurants in the UK (as of the 2013 edition of the guide) to have received the maximum score of ten out of ten by the Good Food Guide. He was the first self-taught chef to earn three Michelin stars.

Published works

See also
List of three Michelin starred restaurants in the United Kingdom

References

Living people
1934 births
Tanzanian people of Greek descent
Head chefs of Michelin starred restaurants
Tanzanian emigrants to the United Kingdom
British people of Greek descent